Fernando Rech (born March 13, 1974 in Caxias do Sul, Brazil) is a Brazilian former footballer. He played either as a striker or an attacking midfielder.

Life and career
He has retired from football, his last club being Adelaide United in the Australian Hyundai A-League. He is known as Fernando, which was the name he wore on the back of his shirt at Adelaide United (he had previously worn Rech on his shirt in Australia).

In season 2001/02, while playing for the Brisbane Strikers in the now defunct National Soccer League, he won the Johnny Warren Medal for player of the year.

Club statistics

References

External links

1974 births
Living people
Adelaide United FC players
Brisbane Strikers FC players
Parramatta Power players
Brazilian footballers
Brazilian expatriate footballers
Esporte Clube Juventude players
Yokohama Flügels players
J1 League players
Expatriate footballers in Japan
Sociedade Esportiva Palmeiras players
Sport Club Internacional players
Campeonato Brasileiro Série A players
A-League Men players
Brazilian people of German descent
Expatriate soccer players in Australia
Association football midfielders